Atis Slakteris (born 21 November 1956, Code parish) is a former Minister of Defence of Latvia, and Minister of Finance from December 2007 to March 2009.

Controversy
In late 2008, Slakteris gave an interview with Bloomberg about Latvia's economic crisis, during which he answered a question regarding the causes of Latvia having come to borrow money from the International Monetary Fund as "nothing special". The phrases "nasing spešal" (mocking Slakteris' poor English and heavy accent during the interview), "we will be taupīgi (Latvian for "frugal")" and "my answer will be, but I will not say" became popular memes in Latvia. Slakteris admitted that his English language skills were not perfect, but said that the fragments with the phrases shown on TV3 had been taken out of context and believed the controversy was politically engaged.

References

External links
Controversial interview on Bloomberg TV (download)

1956 births
Living people
People from Bauska Municipality
Latvian Farmers' Union politicians
People's Party (Latvia) politicians
Ministers of Defence of Latvia
Ministers of Finance of Latvia
Deputies of the 7th Saeima
Deputies of the 8th Saeima
Deputies of the 9th Saeima
Latvia University of Life Sciences and Technologies alumni